A tannate is the salt or ester of tannic acid. Albumin tannate (also known as Tannin albuminate) is an antidiarrheal, commonly in the form of gelatin.

References

Hydrolysable tannins